The Chaldean Democratic Union is a Christian democrat political party in Iraq and within Iraqi Kurdistan a component of the Kurdistani Alliance, designed to promote the Chaldean ethnicity and heritage. They had one member in the Iraqi National Assembly - Ablahad Afraim Sawa - who was elected in both January 2005 and December 2005. The party was created with the help of the Kurdistan Regional Government after the 2003 invasion of Iraq. 
The party won the Christian reserved seat in the 2009 Basra governorate election.

References

External links
Official website

Assyrian political parties
Conservative parties in Iraq
Christian democratic parties in Asia
Political parties of minorities in Iraq
Political parties in Kurdistan Region